Maximilian Mechler (born January 3, 1984) is a German ski jumper who has competed since 2000. His career best achievement is a silver medal at the 2012 Ski Flying Championships in Vikersund. At World Cup level, Mechler's best individual finish is third in Trondheim on 6 December 2003 and victory in a team event in Willingen on 8 January 2005.

References

1984 births
Living people
People from Isny im Allgäu
Sportspeople from Tübingen (region)
German male ski jumpers
21st-century German people